Madegalatha is a genus of moths of the family Noctuidae. The genus was described by Viette in 1965.

Species
 Madegalatha malagassica (Hampson, 1909)
 Madegalatha occidentis (Viette, 1968)

References

Hadeninae